Philip Coppens may refer to:
Philip Coppens (chemist) (1930–2017), professor of chemistry and crystallography
Philip Coppens (author) (1971–2012), writer on ancient and alternative history